The 1997 ATP Buenos Aires was an ATP Challenger Series men's tennis tournament held in Buenos Aires, Argentina. The tournament was held from 24 November until 1 December 1994. Franco Squillari won the singles title.

Finals

Singles
 Franco Squillari defeated  Diego Moyano 6–1, 6–4

Doubles
 Diego del Río /  Daniel Orsanic defeated  Pablo Albano /  Luis Lobo 6–4, 4–6, 6–1

External links 
 International Tennis Federation (ITF) tournament edition details

 
ATP Buenos Aires
ATP Buenos Aires
November 1997 sports events in South America
December 1997 sports events in South America